Karor Lal Esan , is a tehsil located in Layyah District, Punjab, Pakistan. It is administratively subdivided into 14 Union Councils, one of which form the tehsil capital Karor Lal Esan.

Chak 98/ml
Chak 100/ML
Layyah
Layyah District

References

Layyah District
Tehsils of Punjab, Pakistan